The Journal of Experimental and Theoretical Artificial Intelligence is a quarterly peer-reviewed scientific journal published by Taylor and Francis. It covers all aspects of artificial intelligence and was established in 1989. The editor-in-chief is Eric Dietrich (Binghamton University), the deputy editors-in-chief are Li Pheng Khoo (School of Mechanical & Aerospace Engineering, Nanyang Technological University) and Antonio Lieto (Department of Computer Science, University of Turin).

Abstracting and indexing 
The journal is abstracted and indexed in:

According to the Journal Citation Reports, the journal has a 2020/2021 impact factor  of 2.340 .

References

External links 
 

English-language journals
Computer science journals
Taylor & Francis academic journals
Quarterly journals
Publications established in 1989